Estádio Municipal Antônio Fernandes, is a football stadium located in Guarujá, São Paulo, Brazil. It has a maximum capacity of 8,000 people. The stadium is owned by the Guarujá City Hall. Associação Desportiva Guarujá play their home games at this stadium. It is one of the two hosts of the 2009 Copa Libertadores de Fútbol Femenino.

References

Football venues in São Paulo (state)
Sports venues in São Paulo (state)